Nordwestuckermark is a municipality in the Uckermark district, in Brandenburg, Germany.

History and community structure
The community Nordwestuckermark was formed on 1 November 2001 from the previously independent municipalities Ferdinandshorst, Fürstenwerder, Gollmitz, Kraatz, Naugarten, Röpersdorf/Sternhagen, Schapow, Schönermark und Weggun (Amt Nordwestuckermark) and the municipality Holzendorf (department Prenzlau-Land).

The community Nordwestuckermark has the following districts:

Demography

Photo gallery

See also
Fürstenwerder
Großer See

References

Localities in Uckermark (district)